The Thai National Institute of Health is the national health institute of Thailand.

External links 
 Official website (Thai)
 Official website (English)

Medical and health organizations based in Thailand
Sub-departmental government bodies of Thailand
Ministry of Public Health (Thailand)